Cortot is a surname. Notable people with the surname include:

Alfred Cortot (1877–1962), French pianist, conductor, and teacher
Jean-Pierre Cortot (1787–1843), French sculptor
Jean Cortot (1925–2018), French poet, painter, and illustrator
   

French-language surnames